"Time (Clock of the Heart)" is a song by the British new wave band Culture Club, released as a stand-alone single in most of the world and as the second single from their debut album Kissing to Be Clever in North America. Following on the heels of the band's global #1 hit, "Do You Really Want to Hurt Me", "Time (Clock of the Heart)" peaked at #3 on the UK Singles Chart, selling over 500,000 copies in the UK. In the United States, the song matched the #2 peak of its predecessor on the Billboard Hot 100, kept from the #1 spot by "Flashdance... What a Feeling" by Irene Cara for two weeks.

In Europe and United Kingdom, it was a stand-alone single, released in November 1982. For this market, its first inclusion on a Culture Club album was on their 1987 compilation, called This Time: The First Four Years.

Cash Box said the song has "a gentle funk anchor on an otherwise airy romantic ballad."  In a retrospective review of the song, Allmusic journalist Stewart Mason wrote: "Of all of Culture Club's early hits, Time (Clock of the Heart) has probably aged the best. Boy George drops the cryptic self-mythology long enough to deliver a tender, heartfelt lyric on lost love."

The music video has been released in two versions. The only difference was a scene where the group is watching television, along with vocalist Helen Terry. In one version, a Christmas tree is shown. In the other, the tree is removed. This was because of the date of release for certain markets. The "Christmas" version (which is on the 2005 DVD "Greatest Hits") was for European countries and the "regular version" was for the other markets, where the song was released in Spring 1983.

The US single was released with the B-side being an instrumental version of the song called "Romance Beyond the Alphabet", which not only removed the vocals but at least one layer of melody as well.

The music video was featured during a flashback scene on the TV show Mr. Robot, season 4, episode 3.

The song has been re-recorded as a dance/pop track and been re-released as "Time 2022" on digital/streaming platforms.

Formats and track listing
7" Single (UK, Europe, Canada)
"Time (Clock of the Heart)" – 3:42
"White Boys Can't Control It" – 3:42

7" Single (U.S.)
"Time (Clock of the Heart)" – 3:41
"Romance Beyond the Alphabet" (Time Instrumental) – 3:34

12" Single (UK, Europe)
A1."Time (Clock of the Heart)" – 3:42
B1."White Boys Can't Control It" – 3:42
B2."Romance Beyond the Alphabet" – 3:44

12" Single (Canada)
A1."Time (Clock of the Heart)" – 3:42
B1."Romance Beyond The Alphabet" – 3:42
B2."I'm Afraid Of Me (Extended Version)" –

12" Single/EP (Japan)
A1."Time (Clock of the Heart)" – 3:42
A2."White Boy (Long Version)"
B1."I'm Afraid Of Me (Long Version)" –
B2."Do You Really Want To Hurt Me (Dub Version)" –

Personnel
 Culture Club
Boy George: lead vocals and backing vocals
Roy Hay: electric guitar and backing vocals
Mikey Craig: keytar
Jon Moss: drums and backing vocals
 Additional members
 Helen Terry: backing vocals
Phil Pickett: piano, glockenspiel and tubular bells
Steve Grainger: saxophone
Trevor Bastow: strings arrangement

Charts

Weekly charts

Year-end charts

Certifications

Notes

External links
Culture Club Official Website
"Time (Clock of the Heart)" lyrics

1982 singles
1983 singles
Culture Club songs
Leah Dizon songs
Music videos directed by Steve Barron
Songs written by Boy George
Songs written by Roy Hay (musician)
Songs written by Mikey Craig
Songs written by Jon Moss
1982 songs
Virgin Records singles